Raymond Bernard Ash (November 11, 1936  May 24, 2016) was a Canadian football player who played for the Saskatchewan Roughriders, Winnipeg Blue Bombers and Edmonton Eskimos. He won the Grey Cup with Winnipeg in 1961 and 1962. He is a member of the Winnipeg High School Football Hall of Fame, inducted in 2008. Ash died in 2016 at the age of 79.

References

1936 births
2016 deaths
Edmonton Elks players
Saskatchewan Roughriders players
Sportspeople from Timmins
Winnipeg Blue Bombers players
Players of Canadian football from Ontario